Jade de Klerk (born 24 February 1999) is a South African cricketer. He made his Twenty20 debut for Eastern Province in the 2017 Africa T20 Cup on 2 September 2017.

In December 2017, he was named in South Africa's squad for the 2018 Under-19 Cricket World Cup. He made his first-class debut for Eastern Province in the 2017–18 Sunfoil 3-Day Cup on 22 February  2018, taking five wickets in the first innings. He made his List A debut for Eastern Province in the 2017–18 CSA Provincial One-Day Challenge on 11 March 2018.

In August 2018, he was awarded a senior contract by Cricket South Africa ahead of the 2018–19 domestic season. In September 2018, he was named in Eastern Province's squad for the 2018 Africa T20 Cup. In September 2019, he was named in Eastern Province's squad for the 2019–20 CSA Provincial T20 Cup.

References

External links
 

1999 births
Living people
South African cricketers
Eastern Province cricketers
Place of birth missing (living people)